Tashiro's indicator is a pH indicator (pH value: 4.4–6.2), mixed indicator composed of a solution of methylene blue (0.1%) and methyl red (0.03%) in ethanol or in methanol.
 Used e.g. for the titration of ammonia in Kjeldahl analysis.

Colours
 In acids: violet
 At equivalence point (pH 5.2): grey
 In bases: green
The function of the methylene blue is thus to change the red-yellow shift of methyl red to a more distinct violet-green shift.

See also
Litmus
pH Indicator

References

PH indicators